Pyinmana District was a district of Mandalay Division, Myanmar.Later it was renamed as Naypyidaw District.Since 2011, it was separated from Mandalay Region and organized under Naypyidaw Union Territory.In 2013, Naypyidaw district was divided into two districts, Dekkhina and Ottara.

History
Yamethin District is a district of Mandalay Division and consists of 5 townships, Yamethin, Pyawbwe, Pyinmana, Lewe and Tatkon.In 2006, the new capital Naypyidaw was built in KyatPyay which located near Pyinmana.In February 2006, Pyinmana Township, Takon Township and Lewe Township are separated from Yamethin District and formed as Pyinmana District.On 26 November 2008, some areas of those 3 townships were separated and formed Naypyidaw Township with 16 wards and 202 villages.On 28 January 2009, Pyinmana District was renamed Naypyidaw District.On 26 March 2009, Naypyidaw Township was divided into new (5) Thiri Townships and expanded to a total of 8 townships.

According to the 2008 Constitution, Union Territory was formed with (1) district and (8) townships.On 11 January 2013, Naypyidaw district was divided into two district, Dekkhina and Ottara.

References

Mandalay Region
Naypyidaw
Districts of Myanmar